Niemirów  is a settlement in the administrative district of Gmina Rejowiec, within Chełm County, Lublin Voivodeship, in eastern Poland.

The settlement has a population of 19.

The locale's designation derives from the Slavic given name Niemir.

References

Villages in Chełm County